Ine Kristine Hoem (born 19 December 1985 in Oslo, Norway) is a Norwegian jazz singer and the daughter of the author Edvard Hoem. She is also known as the lead singer of the genre band PELbO.

Career 
Hoem got her music diploma from the Jazz program at Norwegian University of Science and Technology (2009).

Within the band PELbO, she released the album PELbO (2010) and  Days Of Trancendence (2011). The album PELbO was nominated for the 2010 Open class Spellemannprisen. She has also collaborated with bassist Jo Skaansar on the album Den Blåaste Natt.

Discography

Solo albums 
2015: Angerville (Propeller Recordings)

Collaborations 
With Jo Skaansar
2010: Den Blåaste Natt (ta:lik)

Within PELbO
2010: PELbO (Riot Factory)
2011: Days Of Trancendence (Riot Factory)

References

External links 

Norwegian women jazz singers
Musicians from Oslo
Norwegian jazz composers
Propeller Recordings artists
Norwegian University of Science and Technology alumni
1985 births
Living people
20th-century Norwegian women singers
20th-century Norwegian singers
21st-century Norwegian women singers
21st-century Norwegian singers
PELbO members